This is a list of Belgian television related events from 2006.

Events
19 February - Kate Ryan is selected to represent Belgium at the 2006 Eurovision Song Contest with her song "Je t'adore". She is selected to be the forty-eighth Belgian Eurovision entry during Eurosong held at the VRT Studios in Schelle.
3 March - The 2001 Miss Belgium Dina Tersago and her partner Wim Gevaert win the first season of Sterren op de Dansvloer.
29 May - Kirsten Janssens wins the fifth season of Big Brother.
28 December - Star Academy 4th-place finisher Pim Symoens wins the second season of Big Brother VIPs.

Debuts
13 January - Sterren op de Dansvloer (2006–2013)
26 November - Mega Mindy (2006–present)

Television shows

1990s
Samson en Gert (1990–present)
Familie (1991–present)
Wittekerke (1993-2008)
Thuis (1995–present)
Wizzy & Woppy (1999-2007)

2000s
Big Brother (2000-2007)
Idool (2003-2011)
X Factor (2005-2008)

Ending this year

Births

Deaths

See also
2006 in Belgium